Atyashevsky District (Otäžbuje; , Atäševań ajmak) is an administrative and municipal district (raion), one of the twenty-two in the Republic of Mordovia, Russia. It is located in the east of the republic. Its administrative center is the urban locality (a work settlement) of Atyashevo. As of the 2010 Census, the total population of the district was 20,161, with the population of Atyashevo accounting for 31.0% of that number.

Administrative and municipal status
Within the framework of administrative divisions, Atyashevsky District is one of the twenty-two in the republic. It is divided into one work settlement (an administrative division with the administrative center in the work settlement (inhabited locality) of Atyashevo), and eighteen selsoviets, all of which comprise fifty-seven rural localities. As a municipal division, the district is incorporated as Atyashevsky Municipal District. Atyashevo Work Settlement is incorporated into an urban settlement, and the eighteen selsoviets are incorporated into eighteen rural settlements within the municipal district. The work settlement of Atyashevo serves as the administrative center of both the administrative and municipal district.

References

Notes

Sources

Districts of Mordovia
 
